Renaudot may refer to:

 Eusèbe Renaudot (1646–1720), French theologian and expert on Eastern languages
 Gabrielle Renaudot Flammarion (1867–1962), French astronomer
 Théophraste Renaudot (1586–1653), French physician, medical author, and founder of a weekly newspaper
 Renaudot (crater), Martian impact crater
 Prix Renaudot (Renaudot Prize), a French literary award